McGill University's Solar Car Team was composed of students from the faculties of Engineering and Computer Science. From 1990 - 2010, the team designed, built, tested and raced 3 generations of solar vehicles in international competitions. Under the brand Team iSun, the team placed 9th in the 2003 American Solar Challenge from Chicago to Los Angeles, and notably produced the lightest solar vehicle in the competition at 318 lbs. Through the production and racing of solar vehicles, the students on the team learn and exercise teamwork, personal initiative, and responsibility - not only in the engineering disciplines of design and analysis, but also in construction, marketing, project management, and promotion. Team members make an effort to promote engineering and computer science careers in their frequent meetings with elementary school, high school, and CEGEP students.

The Cars

Team RaPower
McGill University's first generation solar car

Team Northern Sun
McGill University's second generation solar car

Team iSun

iSun is McGill University's third generation solar car.

iSun raced in the 2002 Formula Sun Grand Prix in Topeka Kansas, and the 2003 American Solar Challenge from Chicago to Los Angeles where iSun was the lightest entry weighing in a 318 lbs.

Name: 
No. of Passager: 1
Speed: Drove at 109 km/h during NASC, top achievable speed 130 km/h
Weight: 340 lb without driver; 520 lb with the driver.
Battery: 30 kg lithium polymer battery pack from Kokam
Motor: New Generation Motors at 6 hp
Size: 5 m long X 1.8 m wide 
Power from Sun: 900 Watts
Max Driving distance at night: Expect 300 km at 40 km/h.
Worth: $600,000 without labour cost
Major cost:
 Models for top shell, bottom shell and canopy
 carbon fibre and other composites
 Batteries
 printed circuit board
 autoclave time
 precision metal fabrication
 titanium and other metal
Race:
 FSGP (Formula Sun Grand Prix)
 NASC 2003 (North American Solar Challenge)

Environmental Events 2002-2003 

Team iSun participated in the following environmentally focused events in 2002-2003.

Clean Air Day

Clean Air Day 2002 was a chance for the team to have the car on display in the heart of downtown Montreal. Thousands of spectators passed by to see the car, as well as other environmental projects sponsored by the city of Montreal, STCUM and Hydro Quebec.

McGill Envirofest

McGill Envirofest 2002 was an all day event on McGill Campus in the fall of 2002. The iSun car was featured alongside a hybrid electric vehicle. The day was spent educating the McGill student body and members of the public about environmental issues in transportation.

Forum on Advanced Transport and Urban Mobility

The 2002 Forum on Advanced Transportation and Urban Mobility was an event sponsored by the province of Quebec and Hydro Quebec. Held in St. Jerome over a weekend in the fall, the event saw thousands of students and members of the public in attendance.

Quebec Minister for Energy

The Quebec Minister for Energy, Rita Dione-Marsolais came to see the car and the team at the ICP Global Technologies headquarters. She spent some time discussing the project and the future of renewable energy technologies with the team.

Clean Energy Awareness Promotions 2002-2003

During 2002-2003 The car was presented at these events as a special attraction.

The 2002 Montreal International Auto Show

The 2002 Montreal International Auto Show hosted the team as a feature attraction.

Team iSun was written up on the Auto show web site and in the Auto show Program.

Organizers estimated attendance to the Auto show at well over 150 000 people. The team also appeared at the 4th annual Val d'OR Auto Show in the fall.

Expoplast 2002

Expoplast 2002 was a Canada wide plastics trade show held at Palais de Congres. Thousands of engineers were in attendance. Team iSun opened the event with the president of the Canadian Plastics Industry Association and had the car on display for the three days of the event.

Muscle Car Night

Muscle car night at the Big Orange brings hundreds of people and exotic vehicles every Thursday during the summer. Team iSun made a visit this year and was widely acclaimed as the winner in the exotic vehicle category.

Educational Initiatives 2002-2003

Salon de l’Education

Salon de l'Education is a large educational trade show held every year at the Palais De Congres in Montreal. Almost every high school in the Montreal area sends graduating students to the event. Team iSun was on hand with the car and the team to educate about renewable energy resources.

Institut Riene Marie

A local all girls school, Intsitut Riene Marie hosted Team iSun for a presentation on women in Engineering by Team member Emilie Fortier as well as an educational presentation on alternative energy.

Scout Centre Opening

Team iSun presence at the opening of a new scout centre in Dorval in November 2002 allowed a whole troupe of scouts to experience solar power first hand. Team members gave a presentation on the project and conducted a demonstration drive of the car. In addition, Collaboration with students from CEGEP Marianopolis have helped to educate students about engineering and responsible stewardship of the environment.

All these public relations events have garnered the team a great deal of media exposure in print, as well as on TV and radio.

In 2002/2003 the team was featured:
 On the BBC World News Homepage.
 In a 7 minute radio interview on CJAD.
 In the Journal De Montreal.
 In La Presse.
 On TVA news.
 On CFCF news. 
 On CKMI news.
 On RDI Auto Show Coverage.
 On LDN news.
 On the cover of the May issue of Design Product News.
 In advertisements on CHOM for the Auto Show.
 In a feature article in Plastics and Mould Magazine.
 In the McGill Daily.
 In the McGill Tribune.
 In a feature article in the McGill Reporter.
 In a 3 page feature article in the McGill News.
 In a write-up in the Montreal International Auto Show program
 The American Solar Challenge program
 The combined distribution and exposure of the above media coverage is estimated at well over 5 million people. This is in addition to all the major press coverage gleaned from the American Solar Challenge.

McGill University News
The documents published by McGill University at the time of the event

iSun Car Technical Details 
iSun underwent many changes since the 2001 American Solar Challenge, the basic layout of structural and aerodynamic features remained relatively constant. Some pictures of components, construction and testing are below.

Canopy 
The car continued to utilize the three-wheeled configuration and a ‘bubble–style’ canopy with lexan windshield. The previous carbon fiber canopy was replaced with a kevlar model, in order to improve transmission of telemetry data (the carbon fiber was conductive and scrambled the signal).

Battery Pack 
The battery pack consisted of hundreds of lithium polymer cells and charging circuitry. For optimal safety, the battery pack was housed in a removable, non-conductive, impact resistant Kevlar box that was firmly attached to the front of the chassis during racing.

Driver Position/Weight Distribution 
Realizing that moving the driver further forward could improve the handling and probably reduce rolling resistance (we ended up with too much weight on the rear tire). This problem also arose from the fact that the car was designed to accommodate a 6 foot driver which is not at all a necessity. The other teams design for a 5’5” driver or smaller in order to have more precise weight distribution with the accompanying ballast.

Ride Height 
The current version of the car has a disproportionately large canopy. It's possible that reducing the size of the canopy could realize the greatest gains in improved aerodynamics for the car. Unfortunately, since the car is so low to the ground, and the air-foil is so thin, this canopy is necessary to meet the minimum driver eye height requirement of 70 cm.

Front Track 
Unable to incorporate full front fairings over the front wheels to reduce drag. The limiting factor is that the wheels are so close to the side of the vehicle, that when turning to pass the figure eight test, the apex of the wheel almost leaves the shadow cast by the car. It might be possible to still incorporate a full fairing, but it would be hard to interface it nicely with the shell. For the future, the suggestion is designing the fairing with the shell and molding them together, or as two separate parts.

Solar Array Design 
Basically the process was to first determine how many cells would fit on the car. The modules were encapsulated by SunCat solar (who charges for each different size or module and for cutting cells as well). The challenge was to use as few module sizes as possible, and to cover the car with as many cells as possible. A mock up of the top shell totally covered with cells and drew modules over it had to be used. Settling on 6 sectors of modules, one in the front with a buck tracker, one in the back with a buck tracker, one on either side of the canopy with a boost tracker, and one up either side with a buck tracker (Buck and Boost refers to the maximum power point trackers that operate each module at peak efficiency given the solar load).

Obviously the challenge is to make sure your boost trackers will always be boosting (sector voltage always below battery voltage) and your buck trackers will always be bucking (sector voltage above battery voltage). This makes the layout more complicated as you have many variables to consider. Interconnecting modules under the car which makes for easy maintenance, testing and the option to change the configuration of the module sectoring if by choice.

Brakes Design 
The method of designing the brakes was a bit suspect. Instead of looking at other solar cars, picking a friction co-efficient for other brake pads and calculated the force necessary to stop with the required deceleration (plus a safety factor). Then calculated the braking force that this would require from the driver. Having no actual test data made us end up with a design that was way overbuilt. It takes little effort from the driver the lock up the brakes with the current 9:1 ratio of pedal force to master cylinder force. It could probably do with 3:1 and save around 1 kg in the master cylinder brake linkage.

Steering 
We originally used Lear Jet gearboxes and cables from Aeronvironment for the steering system. However, we found the cables gave too much friction to the system and prevented self-centering of the steering system. In testing we found self-centering steering to be a very important safety consideration–especially with the sensitive steering in the solar car. Self-centering also decreases driver fatigue as the solar car will tend to go in a straight line with little effort from the driver. The friction problem was solved with new (regular) cables and with breaking in of all the rodends in the steering system (ie. Putting them in a drill and wearing out some of the lining!). A third cable around the driver was pretentioned to get rid of the remaining backlash and we were off to the races.

Chassis Construction 
The team ran out of nomex honeycomb at Bell Helicopter and so they had to use Aluminum for the top plate, this added some weight, but also some resistance to dropped tools, elbows and knees. All the hard points for the suspension, and battery mounting were reinforced with solid kevlar blocks, surrounded by putty (instead of, and filled into the honeycomb respectively). Also all the hard points were reinforced with extra plies of carbon and sheet adhesive. There were real problems with leaky molds for the side beams and shells.

Made the molds directly from an NC at Formglass instead of having them machine a plug. This resulted in the foam and plywood molds warping in the oven and making leaks which resulted in poor adhesion of the plies to the core. I would rather have made plugs at Formglass and made chopped fiber molds from the plugs. These molds are cumber some, but they last forever. To stick the chassis plates together the team conducted some tests with wet layup carbon and methacrylate adhesive. A bead of adhesive proved to work extremely well and the test plates failed at the carbon just above the bead. The final design used a mechacrylate bead with wet layup carbon over it and has proved to work well. A black magic marker was used to color the wetlayup and is a large part of the reason that people say the car looks so nice!

Top and Bottom Shell 
The top shell consists of a 3K plain weave carbon prepreg laminate (1 layer per side) sandwiching a lightweight 3/8 ” nomex honeycomb core. The chassis and bottom shell, have been joined together as one structural component. These have also been constructed of the same 3K plain weave prepreg carbon fiber over both 3/” aluminum honeycomb (with core-bonding sheet adhesive) and 1/” nomex core, depending on the structural requirements of the region in question. Chassis ‘hard-points’ were reinforced with solid Kevlar 285 layups 3/8” thick to resist the out-of-plane compressive stresses resulting from tensioned bolts.

The bottom shell is reinforced under the drivers ass and is otherwise very light weight (1 ply either side). The top shell is made of carbon and this is the reason for the array fire in 2001. To prevent against this problem in 2002, much care needed to be taken with the wiring and installation of modules on the top shell. The whole job ended up with the array being much heavier than originally intended. Avoid carbon for the future–many cars have kevlar top shells that are light and stiff. I would also incorporate ribs into the top shell to keep it stiff under shock loading (Bumps, etc...) This makes it much easier for the driver to drive and is much easier on the cells themselves. The original design had no ribs and would deform (especially in the back) when the car was in motion. Another thing that many teams do is to incorporate most of the bottom shell into the top shell as one piece. This makes the chassis easier to work with, and gives the shell more rigidity as a closed shape. It also gives more options for driver egress as you can incorporate a latching system to swing the topshell open. However, this might not be advisable with our current chassis design.

The advice is to be creative, and not to use excessive safety factors (avoid the’ just in case’ doubling of safety factors–your car will end up too strong and too heavy). Testing will tell you if something needs to be redone.

See also
 List of solar car teams
 McGill University

References

External links
 McGill University Solarcar Team Official Site
 McGill University
 North American Solar Challenge

Environmental engineering
Solar car racing